Maciste the Policeman (Italian:Maciste poliziotto) is a 1918 Italian silent film directed by Roberto Roberti and starring Bartolomeo Pagano and Claudia Zambuto.

Cast
 Bartolomeo Pagano as Maciste  
 Italia Almirante-Manzini 
 Ruggero Capodaglio 
 Claudia Zambuto 
 Vittorio Rossi Pianelli 
 Arnaldo Arnaldi

References

Bibliography
 Jacqueline Reich. The Maciste Films of Italian Silent Cinema. Indiana University Press, 2015.

External links

1918 films
1910s Italian-language films
Films directed by Roberto Roberti
Italian silent feature films
Maciste films
Italian black-and-white films
Silent adventure films